Ignacio Carrera Pinto (February 5, 1848 – July 10, 1882) was a Chilean hero of the War of the Pacific. Carrera and his 77 men of the Fourth Company of Chacabuco are regarded in Chile as great heroes, and are commonly referred to as the "Héroes de la Concepción", after all were killed in the Battle of La Concepción.

Carrera was born in Santiago, Chile; the son of José Miguel Carrera Fontecilla, of Basque descent, and of Emilia Pinto Benavente. He was the grandson of Jose Miguel Carrera Verdugo, one of Chile's independence heroes. He was also the great-grandson and great-nephew of Chile's Presidents Francisco Antonio Pinto and Aníbal Pinto. When the War of the Pacific, between Chile, on one side, and Peru and Bolivia on the other, started in 1879, Carrera Pinto enlisted in the Chilean Army's 7th Mobilized Infantry Regimentthe "Esmeralda" regiment. Over the next few years, Carrera's accomplishments and personal merits resulted in a rapid series of promotions, becoming a lieutenant in 1881 and a captain in 1882. He participated in the Lima Campaign and in the Sierra Campaign.

 In July 1882, during the Sierra Campaign, Captain Carrera was in command of the Esmeralda's Fourth Company of Chacabuco, which was guarding the Peruvian town of La Concepción. Including officers, Fourth Company totaled 77 soldiers, divided into three platoons under lieutenants Julio Montt Salamanca, Luis Cruz Martínez and Arturo Perez Canto. On July 10, 1882, in the Battle of La Concepción, the town was attacked by 400 regular Peruvian soldiers and large groups of natives, which were part of the forces of Andrés Cáceres, a Peruvian officer who was conducting a guerrilla war. Despite being greatly outnumbered and out of ammunition, the Chilean soldiers did not surrender. The last Chilean soldiers died charging the well-armed Peruvian army with only their bayonets.

The Carrera family was one of Chile's most influential families and grew considerably in number. Today, the bulk of the family remains in Santiago and the southern Province of the Bio Bio, although a portion is known to have emigrated to Sweden.

The Chilean one thousand peso banknote bears Ignacio Carrera's face.

References

1848 births
1882 deaths
People from Santiago
Chilean Army officers
Chilean people of Basque descent
Chilean military personnel of the War of the Pacific
Military personnel killed in the War of the Pacific
Carrera family